Torez Georgievich Kulumbegov (September 2, 1938 – October 1, 2006), was a political leader of South Ossetia.

Political career

Following the collapse of the Soviet Union the former Soviet Autonomous Oblast which unilaterally elevated its status to Republic in 1990 and declared its independence from Georgia in 1991. This early South Ossetia did not have a proper Executive branch of government, with the leader being the chairman of the Presidium of the South Ossetian Supreme Council, a role akin to speaker. Kulumbegov ruled as the first chairman starting in December 1990. However, he would be arrested and held prisoner by Georgian police in Tbilisi from 29 January 1991 until January 1992. While he was in prison Znaur Gassiev ruled as the 2nd chairman until his release. When he returned he was restored to his previous position, however, the title was renamed to the Chairman of the State Nyhas.

Personal life

Kulumbegov died in Moscow on 1 October 2006 after a serious illness. He was buried in Tskhinvali.

References

|-

|-

Ossetian people
1938 births
2006 deaths
South Ossetian politicians